Alborz is an  of the Islamic Republic of Iran Navy.

The ship was originally called Zaal, named after Zaal, a mythical warrior of ancient Iran (son of Sām and father of Rostam) and an important character in the Shahnameh. After the Islamic Revolution it was renamed Alborz, after the Alborz mountain range.

History 
She completed her refit on 15 May 1977 at Portsmouth.

On 1 June 1987 Alborz stopped a large bulk carrier Vevey and searched it for possible war material for Iraq. Although this was within the Iranian captain's right to do so under international law, this became known as the first search-and-seizure of the Iran–Iraq War.

In January 2010 the ship was sent to the Gulf of Aden, to help protect ships from Somali Piracy.

In April 2015, Alborz was deployed along with the supply vessel Bushehr to Yemen.

Judging by recent photographs, it underwent another modernization during which the Iranian six-barrel  Kamand anti-aircraft artillery system was installed on it with an opto-electronic system for detecting and tracking targets.

See also

 List of Imperial Iranian Navy vessels in 1979
 List of current ships of the Islamic Republic of Iran Navy

Notes 

Alvand-class frigates
Ships built in Barrow-in-Furness
1969 ships
Frigates of Iran
Iran–Iraq War naval ships of Iran
Frigates of the Cold War